The Shire of Nymboida was a local government area in the Clarence valley of New South Wales between 1913 and 2000. 

The shire was proclaimed on the 6 August 1913 out of the north-western parts of Dorrigo Shire. It's boundaries were modified in November and December 1917, and again in 1956.

The shire offices were located in South Grafton. Aside from Nymboida, significant settlements in the shire included Coutts Crossing, Dundurrabin, Hernani, and Jackadgery.

On 1 July 2000, the shire voluntarily merged with the neighbouring Ulmarra Shire to form the Pristine Waters Shire. This merged entity proved to be short-lived, and was merged with the other local government areas in the Clarence to form the Clarence Valley Council in 2004.

References and notes

Nymboida
Nymboida
Nymboida